Maria Ysabel Ortega Lapid (born January 25, 1999), professionally known as Ysabel Ortega, is a Filipino actress, commercial model, singer and dancer. She rose to fame for playing the main antagonist and villain Charlotte "Charlie" Quiñones in Pusong Ligaw. She also appeared in several shows such as On the Wings of Love, Maalaala Mo Kaya, Ipaglaban Mo! and Born for You.  After four years with ABS-CBN, she transferred to GMA Network.

Early life and education

Ysabel Ortega was born as Maria Ysabel Ortega Lapid in Laoag, Ilocos Norte to Lito Lapid and Michelle Ortega.

Ysabel graduated with a Political Economy degree from the University of Asia and the Pacific. She is keen on continuing her studies and is currently taking up law.

Career
Ortega first appeared as a main villain in Born for You, and then played supporting roles in On the Wings of Love, Maalaala Mo Kaya, and others.

Ortega also played a villainous and obsessed character, again, as the main antagonist Charlotte "Charlie" in Pusong Ligaw, and she became well known because of that role.

Ortega was also seen in Maalaala Mo Kaya.

Later, she became one of the main cast of Araw Gabi as Nica Marcelo.

In 2019, she moved to GMA Network.

In 2020, Ysabel bagged the role of Jamie Robinson in the much-awaited live-action adaptation of the hit anime series Voltes V, Voltes V: Legacy. She did a lot of research and training before auditioning for the role.

Filmography

Television

References

External links

 Ysabel Ortega on IMDb
 Ysabel Ortega on Star Magic
 Ysabel Ortega on GMA Artist Center

1999 births
Living people
21st-century Filipino actresses
ABS-CBN personalities
Star Magic
GMA Network personalities
Filipino film actresses
Filipino people of Spanish descent
Filipino people of Chinese descent
Filipino television actresses
Actresses from Manila